Sealand was the final station on the former Chester & Connah's Quay Railway between Chester Northgate and Hawarden Bridge. Services also passed through this station before joining the North Wales and Liverpool Railway.

History
The station was opened on 17 June 1918 by the Great Central Railway for WWI military personnel based at Sealand Camp. The station, which was originally called Welsh Road Halt, had two adjacent side platforms. It was renamed Sealand in September 1931.

From this station, services from North Wales could either terminate at Chester Northgate Station, the Chester terminus of the Cheshire Lines Committee, or continue on the through line to Manchester Central. Services to and from Liverpool via Bidston used the Grand Central line until joining the Chester & Connah's Quay railway at Dee Marsh junction.

Passenger services ceased on 9 September 1968 when the station was completely closed. The 20-lever signal box continued being used until 14 September 1981.

Even though steelmaking operations at the Corus plant at Shotton ceased in March 1980, freight continued to pass the former station on a double-tracked line until 20 April 1984. Goods services resumed on a single-track line on 31 August 1986 before final closure in the early 1990s. The trackbed is now a cycle way.

Services

References

Sources

External links
 Images of the line in its final operating days

Disused railway stations in Flintshire
Former Great Central Railway stations
Railway stations in Great Britain opened in 1918
Railway stations in Great Britain closed in 1968
Beeching closures in Wales